The 1930–31 Elitserien season was the fourth season of the Elitserien, the top level ice hockey league in Sweden. Seven teams participated in the league, and Sodertalje SK won the league championship.

Final standings

External links
 1930-31 season

Elitserien (1927–1935) seasons
1930–31 in Swedish ice hockey
Sweden